James Zachariah George is a bronze sculpture depicting the politician and military officer of the same name by Henry Augustus Lukeman, installed at the United States Capitol's Visitor Center, in Washington, D.C., as part of the National Statuary Hall Collection. The statue was gifted by the U.S. state of Mississippi in 1931.

See also
 1931 in art

References

External links
 

1931 establishments in Washington, D.C.
1931 sculptures
Bronze sculptures in Washington, D.C.
Confederate States of America monuments and memorials in Washington, D.C.
George, James Z.
Sculptures of men in Washington, D.C.